The Ouachita map turtle (Graptemys ouachitensis) is a species of turtle belonging to the family Emydidae.

Subspecies
Subspecies include:
 Graptemys ouachitensis ouachitensis Cagle, 1953
 Graptemys ouachitensis sabinensis Cagle, 1953
In recent years the Sabine map turtle (Graptemys ouachitensis sabinensis) has been recognized by many as a full species Sabine map turtle (Graptemys sabinensis).

Distribution
This species is endemic to the United States. It can be found in Texas, Louisiana, Mississippi, Alabama, Oklahoma, Kansas, Arkansas, Missouri, Iowa, Minnesota, Wisconsin, Indiana, Ohio, West Virginia, Illinois, Tennessee and Kentucky. G. o. sabinensis exists only in the Sabine River of Louisiana and Texas. Both G. o. ouachitensis and G. o. sabinensis are freshwater riverine turtles. The G. o. ouachitensis is rarely seen on land unless it is nesting season or it is basking.

Description
This species' carapace features a row of low vertebral spines, and is serrated on the posterior rim. The carapace is olive, dark brown, or black in coloration with light yellowish markings with dark borders. The plastron color varies from cream to yellow and is patterned with dark lines and swirls. The body color is grayish brown to blackish and is marked with yellowish stripes.

On the head, it has light yellow spots: a rectangular one behind each eye, an oval under each eye, and a round one on each side of the jaw. In some specimens, the spot behind and the spot under the eye can combine to form a single thick "C" stain. The eye has a black stripe in the middle.

Males are significantly smaller than females. The males can grow to be as large as 5 in (12 cm) in carapace length. The females can grow to be up to 10 in (25 cm) in carapace length.

Natural History 
Hatchlings of this species have recently been found to make sounds prior to exiting the nest. These are mostly "clicking" noises, but more tonal "mewing" sounds are also sometimes present. These sounds are the first documented for any North American hatchling turtle. (Geller, G.A. and G.S. Casper. 2019. Late-term embryos and hatchlings of Ouachita Map Turtles (Graptemys ouachitensis) make sounds within the nest. Herpetological Review 50:449-452)

Diet
Ouachita map turtles feed mainly on small aquatic animals such as shrimp, insects, molluscs, and fish. They also consume algae and aquatic plants.

Pet trade
As they are small, Ouachita map turtles are common among turtle keepers. They can be kept with most other species and can be raised on specialty pellets and dried shrimp. Although they need heat and ultraviolet light (UVB),

Gallery

References

Further reading
Cagle, F.R. 1953. Two New Subspecies of Graptemys pseudogeographica. Occ. Papers Mus. Zool. Univ. Michigan (546): 1-17. ("Graptemys pseudogeographica sabinensis, new subspecies", pp. 2–10; and "Graptemys pseudogeographica ouachitensis, new subspecies", pp. 10–16.)
Conant, R. 1975. A Field Guide to Reptiles and Amphibians of Eastern and Central North America, Second Edition. Houghton Mifflin. Boston. xviii + 429 pp. + 48 Plates.  (hardcover),  (paperback). (Graptemys pseudogeographica ouachitensis and G. p. sabinensis, pp. 57–58, Figure 10. + Plate 8 + Map 14.)
Lindeman, P.V. 2013. The Map Turtle and Sawback Atlas: Ecology, Evolution, Distribution, and Conservation. University of Oklahoma Press. Norman. 460 pp.
Smith, H.M., and E.D. Brodie, Jr. 1982. Reptiles of North America: A Guide to Field Identification. Golden Press. New York. 240 pp.  (paperback). (Graptemys ouachitensis ouachitensis and G. o. sabinensis, pp. 50–51.)

External links
Ouachita Map Turtle, Reptiles and Amphibians of Iowa
Graptemys ouachitensis, Illinois Natural History Survey
Ouachita Map Turtle, Missouri Department of Conservation
 The Reptile Database

Graptemys
Turtles of North America
Endemic fauna of the United States
Reptiles of the United States
Fauna of the Eastern United States
Ouachita Mountains
Reptiles described in 1953